Joy Mrong Kharraswai (born 18 March 1991) is an Indian professional footballer who plays as a midfielder for Rangdajied United F.C. in the I-League.

Career

Youth
Kharraswai used to be a part of the Shillong Lajong F.C. youth set-up before being promoted to the I-League squad but not appearing in a game.

Rangdajied United
Kharraswai made his professional debut for Rangdajied United F.C. in the I-League on 22 September 2013 against Prayag United S.C. at the Salt Lake Stadium in which he came on in the 81st minute for Sandesh Gadkari as Rangdajied United lost the match 0–2.

International
In February 2012, Kharraswai was called up to the India U22 side for a 64-player training camp before the 2014 AFC U22 qualifiers.

Career statistics

References

1992 births
Living people
People from Shillong
Indian footballers
Rangdajied United F.C. players
Association football midfielders
Footballers from Meghalaya
I-League players
Real Kashmir FC players
Shillong Lajong FC players